Grand Prix des Ardennes was a one-day road bicycle race held annually in Belgium, starting and finishing in Saint-Hubert. It was first held in 1945 and held annually until 1948.

Winners

External links
 

Recurring sporting events established in 1945
Recurring sporting events disestablished in 1948
1945 establishments in Belgium
1948 disestablishments in Belgium
Cycle races in Belgium
Defunct cycling races in Belgium
Sport in Luxembourg (Belgium)
Saint-Hubert, Belgium